The following lists events that happened during 1818 in Australia.

Incumbents
Monarch - George III

Governors
Governors of the Australian colonies:
Governor of New South Wales – Lachlan Macquarie
Lieutenant-Governor of Van Diemen's Land – Colonel William Sorell

Events
8 January – Governor Macquarie accuses Samuel Marsden of conspiracy against him
3 March – Throsby, Hume and Meehan discover an overland route to Jervis Bay
19 April – Phillip Parker King discovers Port Essington
28 May – John Oxley leaves Bathurst to explore along the Macquarie River

Births
 22 March – John Ainsworth Horrocks, pastoralist and explorer (born in the United Kingdom) (d. 1846)
 21 May – S. T. Gill, artist (born in the United Kingdom) (d. 1880)
 5 August - Sir Thomas Elder, South Australian politician and pastoralist (born in the United Kingdom) (d. 1897)
 13 August – Edward Wise, New South Wales Supreme Court judge (born in the United Kingdom) (d. 1865)
 5 September – Edmund Kennedy, explorer (born in the United Kingdom) (d. 1848)
 Unknown – Eliza Winstanley, stage actress and writer (born in the United Kingdom) (d. 1882)

References

 
Australia
Years of the 19th century in Australia